Anthony C. Hobson (born March 29, 1959) is an American college women's basketball coach currently coaching at Fort Hays State University. Since Hobson took over at Fort Hays State, the programs as won a conference regular season championships and has appeared in three NCAA tournaments. Prior to his current post, Hobson was the head coach for his alma mater Hastings College from 2001 to 2008, where he led the school to three National Association of Intercollegiate Athletics national championships. Hobson coached at Cloud County Community College and his alma mater Barton Community College prior to coaching at Hastings.

Career

Early coaching career 
Hobson, a Hardy, Nebraska native, began his coaching career in 1983 at Cloud County Community College, where he spent six seasons as the head coach leading the women's basketball program to six consecutive winning seasons. Hobson took eight seasons off to coach at the high school level before he landed a job at his alma mater, Barton Community College. While at Barton, Hobson turned the Lady Cougars program around landing him the Kansas Jayhawk Community College Conference West Division Coach of the Year in 1999. Hobson left Barton after the conclusion of the 1999–2000 season.

Hastings College 
Hobson left Barton County Community College to become an associate head coach for his other alma mater, Hastings College, where he would then take over as head coach in 2001. During his seven seasons at the helm of the Broncos program, Hobson led the program to three NAIA National Championships – two of which were his first two seasons – earning him the NAIA Coach of the Year award all three seasons, and led the team to the NAIA Tournament each season.

Fort Hays State University 
In June 2008, Fort Hays State University chose Hobson to lead its women's basketball program. During his time at Fort Hays State, an NCAA Division II school, the Tigers have won one conference regular season championship, made three NCAA Division II Tournament appearances, and Hobson has earned the MIAA Coach of the Year award both in 2015 and 2016.

Head coach record

References

External links
 Fort Hays State profile

1959 births
Living people
American men's basketball players
American women's basketball coaches
Barton Cougars men's basketball players
Barton Cougars women's basketball coaches
Basketball coaches from Nebraska
Basketball players from Nebraska
Cloud County Thunderbirds women's basketball coaches
Fort Hays State Tigers women's basketball coaches
Hastings Broncos men's basketball players
Hastings Broncos women's basketball coaches
People from Nuckolls County, Nebraska